The 2019 Transplant Games were a multi-sport event held from 17 to 23 August 2019, in Newcastle-Gateshead, United Kingdom. They were the 22nd edition of the World Transplant Games.

The games were organised by the World Transplant Games Federation (WTGF) and NewcastleGateshead Initiative.

Participating nations

Sports

Individual sports 

  Athletics
  Road Race (5 km)
  Badminton
  Bowling
  Cycling
  Darts
  Golf
  Kayak
  Swimming
  Pétanque
  Squash
  Table Tennis
  Tennis
  Virtual Triathlon

Team sports 
  Basketball (3 on 3)
  Football
  Volleyball

Medal table
Medals were awarded to the following countries:

References

External links 
 
 

World Transplant Games
Summer Transplant Games
Summer Transplant Games
Sport in Newcastle upon Tyne
Multi-sport events in the United Kingdom
Summer Transplant Games
21st century in Newcastle upon Tyne